Armand Joseph Jurion (born 24 February 1937), nicknamed Jef, is a Belgian former professional footballer who played for the Belgium national team from 1955 to 1967. Jurion spent most of his club career at R.S.C. Anderlecht where he won nine championship titles and one Cup and was awarded two Golden Shoes. He played in the match Belgium-Netherlands in 1964 with ten teammates from the Anderlecht team after the substitution of goalkeeper Delhasse by Jean-Marie Trappeniers.

Career
"Jef" began to play at Ruisbroek, Flemish Brabant and earned an early interest by Brussels giants Union and Racing White, but he finally signed with Anderlecht. In November 1954, he played his debut game in the first team of Anderlecht against Olympic Charleroi (won 4–2) as a right winger. Jurion remained in the first team until he left for Gent in 1967, to work as a player-coach. His early breakthrough permitted him to play the first European game of Anderlecht, against Hungarian side Vörös Lobogó (currently MTK) in 1955.

Jurion achieved international fame after a memorable goal against Real Madrid in 1962 (a 1–0 win) which qualified Anderlecht for the second round of the Champions Cup after the 3–3 draw at Bernabéu. After this goal, he received the nickname of "Mister Europe". He began his international career in 1955 against France. During his 64 appearances, he played at seven different positions and scored nine times.

He is also remembered as one of very few notable football players, if not the only one, who constantly wore glasses during games.

Jurion then successively coached KSC Lokeren, KSK Beveren and La Louvière.

Honours 
Anderlecht
 Belgian First Division: 1954–55, 1955–56, 1958–59, 1963–64, 1964–65, 1965–66, 1966–67, 1967–68
 Belgian Cup: 1964–65; runner-up 1965–66

Individual
 Belgian Golden Shoe: 1957, 1962
 Ballon d'Or 5th place: 1962
 Ballon d'Or nominations: 1963, 1964

References

External links
 
 
 Bio at skynet.be 
 

1937 births
Living people
Belgian footballers
Association football midfielders
Belgium international footballers
R.S.C. Anderlecht players
K.A.A. Gent players
Belgian football managers
K.S.C. Lokeren Oost-Vlaanderen managers
K.S.K. Beveren managers
R.A.A. Louviéroise managers
People from Sint-Pieters-Leeuw
Footballers from Flemish Brabant